Ambrose Henry Spencer Kyte ( – 16 November 1868) was a merchant and politician in colonial Victoria (Australia).

Kyte was born in Nenagh, Tipperary, Ireland, the son of Stephen Kyte and his wife Margaret, née Mitchell.

Kyte arrived in Melbourne in January 1840, finding work as a brewer's labourer. Kyte opened a hay and corn store in Bourke Street, Melbourne in 1845, later he expanded into general merchandise and invested in urban properties.

In September 1858 Kyte offered a sum of £1000 towards the expenses of an exploring expedition to cross the Australian continent from south to north. This led to the despatch of the ill-fated Burke and Wills expedition in August 1860.

In August 1861 Kyte stood for East Melbourne as a candidate for the Victorian Legislative Assembly, and defeated Edward Langton, who in February 1866 defeated him in a contest for the same constituency. Kyte represented Richmond from January 1867 to December 1867.

Kyte died in Carlton, Victoria on 16 November 1868, survived by his wife, a son and two daughters.

References

1820s births
1868 deaths
Members of the Victorian Legislative Assembly
People from Nenagh
Irish emigrants to colonial Australia
Burials in Victoria (Australia)
19th-century Australian politicians